Launch Complex 9 (LC-9) at Cape Canaveral Space Force Station is a launch pad on Cape Canaveral in Florida. It is north of Launch Complex 17. It is a small concrete structure consisting of an elevated launch pedestal and flame trench, centered on a small oval-shaped concrete pad.

It was used for ten test launches of SM-64 Navaho missiles. The Navaho was a supersonic nuclear-armed cruise missile. In addition to LC-9, Navaho tests were also conducted at LC-10 and Edwards Air Force Base. The Navaho was cancelled after poor performance in testing, eight of the eleven test launches of the final prototype failed. All of the failed launches were conducted from LC-9.

, the concrete launch structure is still standing, but is not maintained; and the launch support equipment has been removed. The site is not accessible to the general public.

See also
Cape Canaveral

References
 Encyclopedia Astronautics: Navaho

External links
 Spherical panoramas of Launch Complex 9, Navaho

Cape Canaveral Space Force Station